is a railway station operated by the Keisei Electric Railway located in Chūō-ku, Chiba Japan. It is 12.9 kilometers from the terminus of the Keisei Chiba Line at Keisei-Tsudanuma Station and is a terminal station for the Keisei Chihara Line.

History 
This was renamed  on 18 November 1931. The station burned down during the Chiba Air Raid of July 6, 1945. On February 10, 1958 the station was relocated to its present location as part of the post-war reconstruction plan for central Chiba. The tracks were elevated in December 1967 and the station was renamed to its present name on April 1, 1987. The Chihara Line began operations from April 1992.

Station numbering was introduced to all Keisei Line stations on 17 July 2010; Chiba-Chūō Station was assigned station number KS60.

Lines 
 Keisei Electric Railway
 Keisei Chiba Line
 Keisei Chihara Line

Layout 
Chiba-Chūō Station has two elevated opposed side platforms with the station building underneath.

Platforms

External links 
  Keisei Station layout

References 

Railway stations in Japan opened in 1921
Railway stations in Chiba Prefecture